Bruno Arcari may refer to:

 Bruno Arcari (boxer) (born 1942), Italian boxer
 Bruno Arcari (footballer) (1915–2004), Italian footballer and coach